Past<Future is the ninth studio album by Japanese pop singer Namie Amuro, released on December 16, 2009. Amuro stated that she saw Past<Future as a "fresh start" following the highly successful Best Fiction (2008).

Only one single, "Wild/Dr.", was released from the album. Several of the album tracks were used in promotional campaigns leading up to its release, including "My Love" and "Copy That", which were used in Vidal Sassoon commercials. A tour in support of the album was announced for April 2010. The album sold 310,323 units within its first six days.

Background
Past<Future was released in Japan on December 16, 2009, as a singular 12-track CD release plus a dual disc set with the album and a separate DVD containing several music videos. Amuro first revealed in the March 2009 issue of S Kawaii that she was preparing a new album which she would begin recording during her Best Fiction Tour. In the interview, she also confirmed that the direction of the album would be different from her previous album. Confirmation of the impending release of Amuro's ninth studio album occurred several months later when media outlets began to report new commercials with new songs by the singer would appear not in a new single, but a new album towards the end of the year.

Of the twelve tracks being released on the album, eleven tracks including "Wild", Dr.", "Fast Car", "My Love", "Copy That", "Bad Habit" "Love Game", "The Meaning of Us", "Shut Up, "Defend Love", and "Steal My Night" were announced on her official site on October 22. The final track, "First Timer" a collaboration with hip hop group Doberman Inc. was announced at a later date.

Unlike Play which was produced solely by Michico and T.Kura of Giant Swing and Nao'ymt, Amuro sought other writers and producers for this project. Dsign Music, a Scandinavian production team was the first to reveal that they had written new material for Amuro on their official website in August 2009. In a blog entry, songwriter/producer, Hiro, who has written for other artists including Kumi Koda and J Soul Brothers, confirmed that he produced "My Love".

Promotion
After the release of the singles "Wild" and "Dr.", the first songs to be promoted from the album were "My Love" and "Copy That", which appeared in new commercials for cosmetics company, Vidal Sassoon. They premiered on the web first and later on television in October 2009. "My Love" would later make its radio premiere on J-Wave's Groove Line on October 27. Both "My Love" and "Copy That" were released as ringtones online on November 18. Two more songs from the album, "Fast Car" and "The Meaning Of Us" also made their radio premieres on November 23 and 24. The music videos for the two respective songs also premiered on music channels. In total, four new music videos have been produced for "Fast Car", "The Meaning Of Us", "Love Game", and "Defend Love." All four videos will appear on a DVD included with the album along with music videos for the previously released "Wild" and "Dr.".

The "Defend Love" music video was a collaboration with Sunrise Animation, featuring Namie Amuro as an animated character interacting with Amuro Ray of Mobile Suit Gundam. Part of the video re-creates the encounter between Amuro Ray and Lalah Sune in the Ghost of Solomon event, with Namie Amuro in place of Lalah piloting a pink Elmeth.

Track listing

Chart performance
The album debuted at number one on the Oricon daily album chart, with a first day sales tally of around 112,000 copies. At the end of its first week of release, the album went on to top the Oricon weekly album chart, selling around 331,000 copies. According to Oricon, the album sold 545,929 copies within ten weeks, surpassing the sales of Amuro's previous studio album, Play. According to Oricon, Amuro's new album Past<Future was the number one album of 2010 for eight months. As of October 2010, Past<Future is the sixth best-selling album of 2010 in Japan. surpassing her 1998 album, Concentration 20 in terms of ranking.

Reception
 rated the album four and a half out of five stars on Rolling Stone Japan.

Charts and certifications

Charts

Sales and certifications

Singles - Oricon Sales Chart (Japan)

References

2009 albums
Namie Amuro albums
Avex Group albums